The Rackets World Championships is the rackets leading event organised by the Tennis and Rackets Association.

The singles world championship began on a challenge basis in 1820. The doubles championship started in 1990.

World Singles Champions

Women Singles Champions

World Doubles Champions

Women's Doubles Champions

References 

Rackets
World Championships